James Leonard Hamilton (born August 4, 1948) is an American basketball coach and the current men's basketball head coach at Florida State University. He is a former head coach at Oklahoma State University, the University of Miami, and for the National Basketball Association's Washington Wizards.  In his 33 years as a collegiate head coach, his teams have qualified for 12 NCAA Division I men's basketball tournaments and 11 National Invitation Tournaments, highlighted by appearances in the NCAA Tournament's Elite Eight (2018) and Sweet 16 (2011, 2019, 2021) with Florida State, as well as a Sweet 16 appearance with Miami (2000). Other career benchmarks include the Big East Conference regular season championship in 2000, the ACC tournament title in 2012 and the ACC regular season championship in 2020. While with the Wizards in 2000–01, they posted a 19–63 record.

Biography
Hamilton played college basketball at the University of Tennessee at Martin.  Hamilton is a member of the Kappa Alpha Psi fraternity. His brother, Ray Jones, coaches a minor-league team.

Hamilton was an assistant coach and associate head coach at the University of Kentucky from 1974 to 1986 under then-head coach Joe B. Hall. Hamilton was on the staff at Kentucky when it finished as the NCAA runner-up in 1975, won the 1978 NCAA Championship and went to the 1984 Final Four. He was a successful recruiter for Kentucky basketball, with players including Jack Givens, James Lee, Sam Bowie, and Melvin Turpin

Hamilton was named ACC Coach of the Year on March 10, 2009, a second time in 2012, and again in 2020. Hamilton is the first coach to be named coach of the year in both the Big East and the ACC. In 2018, he was named the Clarence "Big House" Gaines National Coach of the Year by the National Sports Media Association.

Head-coaching record

College

NBA

|-
| align="left" |Washington
| align="left" |
|82||19||63|||| 7th in Atlantic ||—||—||—||—|| align="center"| Missed Playoffs
|-class="sortbottom"
| align="left" |Career
| ||82||19||63|||| ||—||—||—||—||

Personal life
Hamilton is married to Claudette Hamilton. They have two children.

References

External links
 Florida State profile
 Basketball-Reference.com: Leonard Hamilton

1948 births
Living people
American men's basketball coaches
American men's basketball players
Austin Peay Governors men's basketball coaches
Basketball coaches from North Carolina
Basketball players from North Carolina
College men's basketball head coaches in the United States
Florida State Seminoles men's basketball coaches
Junior college men's basketball players in the United States
Kentucky Wildcats men's basketball coaches
Miami Hurricanes men's basketball coaches
Oklahoma State Cowboys basketball coaches
People from Gastonia, North Carolina
UT Martin Skyhawks men's basketball players
Washington Wizards head coaches